This is a list of windows on Main Street, U.S.A. at the Disney resorts. The names painted in the windows credit some of the parks' major contributors (except at Disneyland Paris, where some refer to characters or stories from Disney films and shows). They typically appear as fictional businesspeople, and often refer to the honoree's development or other interests. Bob Gurr's window, for example, refers to his design of most of the park's vehicles.

Former Disney Imagineering head Marty Sklar said, "To add a name [on a window] today, there are three requirements: Only on retirement;  only [for] the highest level of service/respect/achievement; [and on] agreement between top individual park management and Walt Disney Imagineering, which creates the design and copy concepts [text]."

Windows are listed here in alphabetical order by last name.

A

B

C

D

E

F

G

H

I

J

K

L

M

N

O

P

R

S

T

U

V

W

Y

Other windows

Windows in Frontierland

Windows in Adventureland

Windows in Mickey's Toontown

See also
Main Street, U.S.A.

References

Further reading

External links

LaughingPlace.com list of Main Street, U.S.A. window credits
Windows on Main Street Part One
Windows on Main Street Part Two
Windows on Main Street Part Three
Disneyland Windows on FindingMickey
Main Street Windows on Daveland
Magic Kingdom Windows on MiceChat

Walt Disney Parks and Resorts
 Disney Main Street Window Honors
Disney-related lists
Main Street, U.S.A.